Victoria, Indiana is an unincorporated community in Boon Township, Warrick County, Indiana in the United States.

History

Victoria was first settled as a pioneer camp in the 18th century. In the 1950s, when coal mines began to appear in Southern Indiana, woodlands in that part of the county were replaced by vast strip mines.  The mines were abandoned in 1977, when coal prices dropped and the resources were exhausted.  The land lay unnoticed until Newburgh grew large enough to support suburbs.  Several homes were built around the now water-filled strip mines.  The homes received a boost in land value when Victoria National Golf Club was built by Tom Fazio in 1996.

Victoria National Golf Club is a 21st-ranked golf club, in the U.S, and No. 1 in Indiana.  There is water on 14 golf holes, because the course was once an open strip mine. On July 1, 2012, Victoria inaugurated the United Leasing Championship, a tournament on the PGA's Nationwide Tour, garnering nationwide attention for the southwestern Indiana golf course.

Geography

External links 
 Victoria National Golf Club - Home of the 2006 USGA Senior Amateurs

Unincorporated communities in Indiana
Unincorporated communities in Warrick County, Indiana